Unified Sports Classification System of the USSR is a document which provided general Soviet physical education system requirements for both athletes and coaches. Similar systems still exist today in several former Soviet republics.

Athletes
The classification was established in 1935 and was based on separate classifications, which existed for several sports disciplines before. Starting in 1949, it was revised every four years, the period, which corresponded to the Olympic cycle, to reflect new standards for the physical training. The document contained test standards, principles and conditions, necessary for the conferment of sports ranks and titles, for all sports, cultivated in the USSR.
As of the 1970s, there were following ranks for athletes of the USSR (listed in descending order of value):
Merited Master of Sport of the USSR, (abbreviated as "змс", sometimes translated as Honoured Master of Sport of the USSR), equates to international champion who has made valuable contributions to the sport
Master of Sport of the USSR, International Class (abbreviated as "мсмк"), equates to international champion
Master of Sport of the USSR (abbreviated as "мс"), equates to national champion
Candidate for Master of Sport of the USSR (abbreviated as "кмс"), equates to nationally ranked player
First-Class Sportsman, equates to regional champion
Second-Class Sportsman, equates to state champion
Third-Class Sportsman, equates to city champion
First-Class Junior Sportsman
Second-Class Junior Sportsman
Third-Class Junior Sportsman

Each of these titles was awarded only for results on the official competitions. Athletes who qualified for the rank were awarded a badge with serial number.

This system was popular among Soviet satellite states and was used in Bulgaria, Czechoslovakia, East Germany, Poland, and Romania until the breakup of the USSR in 1991. Russia continued the system, and former Soviet republics Belarus, Moldova, Kazakhstan, Kyrgyzstan, Tajikistan, Ukraine and Uzbekistan also maintain a similar or identical ranking system. In Albania, a similar system, the Sports titles one, was started in 1967.

A new sports title called Merited Master of Sport of Russia was created by the Russian government in 2007 to replace the previous one.

Non-Soviet Masters of Sport
The title of Merited Master of Sport of the USSR was awarded to a select number of foreigners. 

On 30 January 1952, the title Merited Master of Sport of the USSR was awarded to Agustín Gómez Pagóla, who was born in Spain and started to play football there, but moved to the USSR during the Spanish Civil War in 1937, and played for Torpedo Moscow in 1947–1954, being the team captain in 1951–1953.

In 1972, to mark the 50th anniversary of the establishment of the Soviet Union, this title was awarded to the following prominent athletes from Soviet-aligned nations:

 Maria Gigova (world champion in rhythmic gymnastics)
 András Balczó (modern pentathlon, Hungarian Sportsman of the Year in 1966, 1968, 1969)
 Karin Janz (1972 Olympic champion in artistic gymnastics)
 Li Ho-Jun (1972 Olympic champion in shooting)
 Teófilo Stevenson (1972 Olympic champion in boxing) (he later won in 1976 and 1980 also)
 Khorloogiin Bayanmönkh (1972 world champion in freestyle wrestling)
 Włodzimierz Lubański (1972 Olympic champion in football)
 Nicolae Martinescu (1972 Olympic champion in wrestling)
 Ondrej Nepela (1972 Olympic champion in figure skating)

Coaches

Under the Soviet system, titles were awarded to coaches based on national and international success. Significant International success brought Merited Coach of the USSR while national success was rewarded with Merited Coach of one of the Soviet republics.

 Merited Coach of the USSR
 Merited Coach of the Uzbek SSR
 Merited Coach of the Georgian SSR

The same system is in place today for most of the former Soviet republics as well. For example, 

 Merited Coach of Russia
 Merited Coach of Ukraine (
 Merited Coach of Uzbekistan

Non-Russian coaches
Since 2007, a few foreign coaches have been awarded the title of Merited Coach of Russia for their roles in the development of sports in Russia:

   2007: David Blatt, coach of the Russian men's basketball team, champions,  2007 European Championships
 2008: Giovanni Caprara, coach of the Russian women's volleyball team, champions, 2006 European Championships
 2008: Dick Advocaat, football, head coach of Zenit St. Petersburg, champions, 2007–08 UEFA Cup and 2008 UEFA Super Cup
 2013: Guus Hiddink, football, coach of Russian national team, bronze medalists, 2008 European Championships
 2013: Oleg Znarok, hockey, head coach of Dynamo Moscow, champions, 2011/2012 Gagarin Cup 
 2013: Harijs Vītoliņš, hockey, assistant coach of Dynamo Moscow, champions, 2012/2013 Gagarin Cup

Judges and referees

The title of Honored Judge of Russia may be given to sport judges and referees who have reached the level of "All-Russian Sports Official" and have distinguished careers of officiating to their credit.

See also
Ready for Labour and Defence of the USSR
 Master of Sports of Russia
 Unified Sports Classification of Ukraine

References

External links

Mapping of the requirements for weight lifting, swimming and running from Russian to English.
Great Soviet Encyclopedia, 3rd ed., vol. 9, p. 64

1935 documents
1935 establishments in the Soviet Union
1935 in Soviet sport
Sport in the Soviet Union
Sport in Russia
Documents of the Soviet Union
 
Sports
Sports
Sports titles